Valery Frantsevich Zhukovsky (born 21 May 1984) is a Belarusian professional footballer who plays for Neman Grodno.

Honours
Naftan Novopolotsk
Belarusian Cup winner: 2011–12

References

External links

1984 births
Living people
People from Lida
Sportspeople from Grodno Region
Belarusian footballers
Association football midfielders
FC Lida players
FC Belshina Bobruisk players
FC Shakhtyor Soligorsk players
FC Naftan Novopolotsk players
FC Gomel players
FC Dinamo Minsk players
FC Neman Grodno players